Joel Hoffman (born October 14, 1958) is an American former professional tennis player.

Hoffman was a two-time state high school champion at Topeka High School in Kansas and was undefeated his junior year. He played collegiate tennis for the University of Houston, captaining the team as a senior. During the 1980s he featured on the professional tour, where he reached best ranking of 329 in singles and 127 in doubles. He appeared in the main draw of the men's doubles at the 1982 US Open.

ATP Challenger finals

Doubles: 1 (0–1)

References

External links
 
 

1958 births
Living people
American male tennis players
Tennis people from Kansas
Houston Cougars men's tennis players